Ivey is a given name and surname. Notable people with the name include:

Given name 
Ivey Shiver (1907–1972), outfielder in Major League Baseball
Ivey Wingo (1890–1941), Major League Baseball catcher
Newman Ivey White (1892–1948), professor of English at Duke University
William Ivey Long (born 1947), American Tony Award-winning costume designer for stage and film

Surname 
Anna Ivey, American academic and writer
Artis Ivey Jr. or Coolio (1963–2022), American rapper and actor
Barry Ivey (born 1979), Louisiana politician
Bill Ivey (born 1944), seventh chairman of the National Endowment for the Arts
Dana Ivey (born 1941), American actress
Donald Ivey (1922–2018), Canadian physics professor, first host of The Nature of Things
Eowyn Ivey, American author
Ford Ivey, founder of several live action role-playing games
George Ivey (1923–1979), English professional footballer
Jaden Ivey (born 2002), American basketball player
James Ivey, artist from San Diego, California
Jean Eichelberger Ivey (1923–2010), American composer
John E. Ivey Jr. (1919–1992), American educator
Jolene Ivey (born 1961), American politician
Judith Ivey (born 1951), American actress
Kay Ivey (born 1944), the 54th Governor of Alabama (and second female Governor)
Martez Ivey (born 1995), American football player
Mitch Ivey (born 1949), American swimmer and swimming coach
Niele Ivey (born 1977), American basketball player and coach
Paul Ivey (born 1961), English former professional footballer
Phil Ivey (born 1976), American poker player
Richard M. Ivey (1925–2019), Canadian lawyer and philanthropist
Royal Ivey (born 1981), American basketball player
Steve Ivey, American music writer, producer, musician, and recording engineer
Susan Ivey (born 1958), chairman and chief executive officer, Reynolds American
Travis Ivey (born 1986), American football nose tackle
Tyler Ivey (born 1996), American baseball player
William Edward Ivey (1838–1892), New Zealand agricultural scientist and director

See also
Ivy (name), given name and surname
Ivie, given name and surname